The Building at 33 Rua do Carmo is an historical building located at 33 Rua do Carmo, Funchal, Madeira. It has been suggested that it could have been projected to be a synagogue.

History

Jews from Morocco arrived in 1819 and set themselves up in the cloth and wine trades. The Abudarham family (originally from Gibraltar) were involved in the Madeira wine industry from the early 1860s onwards. Rabbi David Zaguri became its spiritual leader in 1857. Another period of immigration followed in the 20th century, with the arrival of refugees from the First and Second World Wars. The Jewish community also grew due to the Evacuation of the Gibraltarian civilian population during World War II to Madeira, which included a number of Jews, some of which are buried in the Jewish Cemetery of Funchal.

Tito Benady, a historian on Gibraltar Jewry, noted that when some 200 Jews from Gibraltar were evacuated as non combatants to Funchal, Madeira, at the start of World War II, they found a Jewish cemetery that belonged to the Abudarham family. The same family after whom the Abudarham Synagogue in Gibraltar was named.

The Jewish Cemetery of Funchal located in nearby Rua do Lazareto, was built in 1851, the last burial took place in 1976.

References

Buildings and structures in Funchal
Jews and Judaism in Madeira
Synagogues in Portugal
Moroccan diaspora in Europe
Moroccan-Jewish diaspora
Gibraltarian diaspora